Ligetfalva is a village in Zala County, Hungary.

External links 
 Street map 
Tourist attraction( in Ligetfalva)

Populated places in Zala County